The 1996 NCAA Division II women's basketball tournament was the 15th annual tournament hosted by the NCAA to determine the national champion of Division II women's  collegiate basketball in the United States.

Three-time defending  champions North Dakota State defeated Shippensburg in the championship game, 104–78, to claim the Bison's fifth NCAA Division II national title. This was North Dakota State's fifth title in six years and fourth of four consecutive titles for the Bison.

The championship rounds were contested in Fargo, North Dakota.

Regionals

East - Shippensburg, Pennsylvania
Location: Heiges Field House Host: Shippensburg University of Pennsylvania

Great Lakes - Louisville, Kentucky
Location: Knights Hall Host: Bellarmine College

North Central - Fargo, North Dakota
Location: Bison Sports Arena Host: North Dakota State University

Northeast - Waltham, Massachusetts
Location: Dana Center Host: Bentley College

South - Cleveland, Mississippi
Location: Walter Sillers Coliseum Host: Delta State University

South Atlantic - Wingate, North Carolina
Location: Cuddy Arena Host: Wingate College

South Central - Abilene, Texas
Location: Moody Coliseum Host: Abilene Christian University

West - Davis, California
Location: Recreation Hall Host: University of California, Davis

Elite Eight - Fargo, North Dakota
Location: Bison Sports Arena Host: North Dakota State University

All-tournament team
 Kasey Morlock, North Dakota State
 Lori Roufs, North Dakota State
 Jenni Rademacher, North Dakota State
 Jennifer Clarkson, Abilene Christian
 Caroline Omamo, Abilene Christian

See also
 1996 NCAA Division II men's basketball tournament
 1996 NCAA Division I women's basketball tournament
 1996 NCAA Division III women's basketball tournament
 1996 NAIA Division I women's basketball tournament
 1996 NAIA Division II women's basketball tournament

References
 1996 NCAA Division II women's basketball tournament jonfmorse.com

 
NCAA Division II women's basketball tournament
1996 in North Dakota